El Crucificado ("The Crucified One") is a 1957 play in three acts by the Guatemalan Carlos Solórzano.  It describes the events of Good Friday but sets them in modern times.  The work is a tragic farce and is one of Solorzano's ten theatrical works.

Dramatis personae
Jesus: Man of approximately 30 years, with Latin American features.
Maria: Mother of Jesus, old woman of the town.
Magdalena: Woman of the town.
Priest
Four apostles: Men of the town who represent Juan (John the Apostle), Pedro (Saint Peter), Mateo (Saint Matthew) and Marcos (Saint Mark).
Men and women of the town.

Synopsis
The play is set in a completely ordinary town where the Passion of the Christ will take place.  A man named Jesus will encounter conflicts in the same manner as the Son of God.

Guatemalan literature
1957 plays